Reinfried Herbst (born 11 October 1978 in Salzburg) is a retired slalom skier from Austria. Herbst won the silver medal for the men's slalom event at the 2006 Winter Olympics in Turin, Italy.

On 11 March 2006 he won his first World Cup race in Shigakogen Slalom.  He was 8th in the slalom World Cup standings after the 2006 season.  In July, 2006 he injured his knee in a charity soccer game.
After two victories in the 2008 season he finished 3rd in the slalom world cup.

World Cup results

Season titles

Season standings

Race podiums
 9 wins (9 Slalom)
 16 podiums (16 Slalom)

Olympic results

World Championships results

References

External links 
 
 
 
 

1978 births
Living people
Sportspeople from Salzburg
Alpine skiers at the 2006 Winter Olympics
Alpine skiers at the 2010 Winter Olympics
Olympic silver medalists for Austria
Austrian male alpine skiers
Olympic alpine skiers of Austria
Olympic medalists in alpine skiing
FIS Alpine Ski World Cup champions
Medalists at the 2006 Winter Olympics
Alpine skiers at the 2014 Winter Olympics